The 1973–74 Honduran Liga Nacional season was the 8th edition of the Honduran Liga Nacional.  The format of the tournament remained the same as the previous season.  C.D. Motagua won the title on 9 September 1973 in the 1–1 away draw against C.D. España and qualified to the 1974 CONCACAF Champions' Cup along with runners-up C.D. Marathón.

1973–74 teams

 Atlético Indio (Tegucigalpa)
 Broncos (Choluteca)
 España (San Pedro Sula)
 Marathón (San Pedro Sula)
 Motagua (Tegucigalpa)
 Olimpia (Tegucigalpa)
 Platense (Puerto Cortés)
 Troya (Tegucigalpa)
 Universidad (Tegucigalpa)
 Vida (La Ceiba)

Regular season

Standings

Top scorers
  Mario Blandón Artica (Motagua) with 13 goals
  Allard Plummer (Marathón) with 13 goals

Squads

Known results

Round 1

Round 6

Round 20

Unknown rounds

References

Liga Nacional de Fútbol Profesional de Honduras seasons
1
Honduras